Kate Kanyi-Tometi Fotso is a Cameroonian businesswoman who founded the largest cocoa exporter in Cameroon. Fotso, according to Forbes Africa, is the richest woman in Cameroon and the 20th richest person in the African Francophonie.

Career 
Fotso has been involved in the cocoa industry for more than 20 years and has been called the "iron lady of the cocoa sector". She was married to André Fotso, a Cameroonian businessman who founded the TAF Investment Group and was head of the Cameroonian Employers' Association. Her husband died on 2 August 2016.

Fotso is a founder and director of the Telcar Cocoa company, the largest exporter of cocoa beans in Cameroon, accounting for 30% of the country's cocoa exports with roughly 48,000 tons of cocoa exported in 2015–2016. Telcar works in close partnership with American agricultural trading firm Cargill. Fotso was appointed by Cameroonian president Paul Biya to represent exporters on the board of directors for the autonomous port of Kribi. Fotso is also a shareholder in Ecobank Cameroun and manages the investments and capital she inherited from her husband. Fotso also runs the "Kargill Cocoa Promise" initiative, a scheme to improve the training of agricultural workers in Cameroon, which resulted in 21,000 cocoa farmers trained in 2011 and 2015.

With a net worth of $252 million, according to Forbes Africa, Fotso is the richest woman in Cameroon. She has the 20th largest fortune of the African Francophonie and is the first woman to ever be ranked in the top 30 in the African Francophonie or Sub-Saharan Africa. She has also been named as one of the top ten most influential people in Cameroon by the French edition of Slate Magazine.

References

Living people
Cameroonian women
Cameroonian businesspeople
Year of birth missing (living people)